The 1989 Dutch Open was a men's Grand Prix tennis tournament staged at 't Melkhuisje in Hilversum, Netherlands and played on outdoor clay courts. It was the 31st edition of the tournament was held from 24 July to 30 July 1989. Eighth-seeded Karel Nováček won the singles title.

Finals

Singles

 Karel Nováček defeated  Emilio Sánchez 6–2, 6–4
 It was Nováček's 1st singles title of the year and the 2nd of his career.

Doubles

 Tomás Carbonell /  Diego Pérez vs.  Paul Haarhuis /  Mark Koevermans, final cancelled due to rain

References

External links
 ITF tournament edition details